Elizeu is a given name. Notable people with the name include:

 Elizeu (footballer, born 1945), full name Elizeu Antônio Ferreira Vinagre Godoy, Brazilian football midfielder
 Elizeu (footballer, born 1979), full name Elizeu Ferreira Marciano, Brazilian football defender
 Elizeu Zaleski dos Santos (born 1986), Brazilian mixed martial artists
 Elizeu (footballer, born 1989), full name Elizeu Araújo de Melo Batista, Brazilian football centre-back

See also
 Eliseu (disambiguation)